Barry R. Cornish is a retired United States Air Force major general who last served as the commander of the Twelfth Air Force. Previously, he was the special assistant to the commander of the Air Force Combat Command.

References

External links

Year of birth missing (living people)
Living people
Place of birth missing (living people)
United States Air Force generals